The Pittsburgh Antique Radio Society (PARS) was established in southwestern Pennsylvania in 1986 by Richard Brewster, John Haught and others.
Its purpose is "the preservation and exhibition of historic communications equipment and early electronic entertainment media, with an emphasis on the Pittsburgh area and related material."

The Pittsburgh Oscillator: journal of the Pittsburgh Antique Radio Society (formerly The Pittsburgh Oscillator: newsletter of the Pittsburgh Antique Radio Society) is published quarterly. Its ISSN is 0879-9480. Its OCLC record number is 17679107.

The Society has also produced a series of 25 publications on various aspects of radio history. Examples are: A Bibliography of Frank Conrad, a comprehensive list of writings by and about Frank Conrad, one of the founders of radio station KDKA (2007); Vintage Radio Redux, the collected essays of radio historian Karl Laurin (2008); and Richard Brewster's An Interview with Harold Beverage (2007). Harold Beverage was the inventor of the wave antenna, also known as the Beverage antenna. A complete list of publications in this series is available on the Society's web page, which is linked below.

The Society has 150 members and meets eight times a year.

References

Further reading 

Bishop, Pete, "Antique radio fans to display century of sound," Tribune-Review (Pittsburgh), April 7, 2000, pp. D1-2.
Criado, Justin, "Antique Radio Society tunes in to niche hobby while preserving radio's rich past," Beaver County Times, (PA), May 8, 2015.
Schaeffer, Katherine, "Collectors, enthusiasts tune in to Tri-State Radio Fest," Timesonline.com.
Schaeffer, Katherine, "Tri-State Radio Fest to showcase vintage audio equipment," Beaver County Times, (Pa), April 15, 2016.

External links 

 Pittsburgh Antique Radio Society

Organizations based in Pittsburgh
Radio organizations in the United States
Organizations established in 1986
1986 establishments in Pennsylvania